Gelin (also Romanized as Gelīn, Galīn, and Galyan) is a village in Jennat Rudbar Rural District, in the Central District of Ramsar County, Mazandaran Province, Iran. At the 2006 census, its population was 45, in 21 families.

References 

Populated places in Ramsar County